The Arakan National Council (abbreviated ANC) is an ethno-political organisation in Myanmar that campaigns for the interests of the Rakhine people. It was founded at a conference between Rakhine insurgent groups in-exile in 2004, and also has an armed wing in Kayin State, known as the Arakan Army.

Naing Soe, a senior leader of the ANC, was arrested in February 2018, following a series of bombings in Sittwe, the capital of Rakhine State. He was later released after police failed to provide evidence linking him to the bombings within 30 days as is required by police procedure.

References

External links 
 

Political parties in Myanmar
Political parties of minorities
Political parties established in 2004